Clarence Ashley "Skipper" Roberts (January 11, 1888 in Wardner, Idaho – December 24, 1963 in Long Beach, California) was a catcher in Major League Baseball.

External links

1888 births
1963 deaths
Major League Baseball catchers
Baseball players from Idaho
St. Louis Cardinals players
Pittsburgh Rebels players
Chicago Whales players
Spokane Indians players
Wichita Jobbers players
Helena Senators players
Missoula (minor league baseball) players